Barringtonia pterita grows as a shrub or tree up to  tall, with a stem diameter of up to . Bark is black. The plant is found in a variety of lowland habitats from sea level to  altitude. The specific epithet pterita is from the Greek meaning "wing", referring to the winged fruit. B. pterita is found in Borneo and the Philippines.

References

pterita
Plants described in 1914
Flora of the Philippines
Flora of Borneo